Trenewith is a surname. Notable people with the surname include:

Ralph Trenewith (disambiguation), multiple people
Stephen Trenewith, MP for Bodmin (UK Parliament constituency)
Nicholas Trenewith, MP for Truro (UK Parliament constituency)

See also
Trenwith